There were 4 Formula One drivers from East Germany, with one of them (Edgar Barth) racing for both East Germany and West Germany.

Former drivers

Timeline

* Competed under West German racing license in  –, –,

See also
 Formula One drivers from Germany

References

 "The Grand Prix Who's Who", Steve Small, 4th ed.